Eliot Hall is a historic building at 7A Eliot Street in Jamaica Plain, Massachusetts, a neighborhood of Boston. It is sometimes referred to as "The Footlight Club," after "America's oldest community theatre," which owns and operates out of the building.

Originally built in 1832 in Greek Revival/Italianate style, the hall was slated for demolition by the time the club's members purchased it in 1889. Since then it has served for over a century as the organization's home and performance venue. The Trustees of Eliot Hall were formed by the group in the 1980s to oversee renovations to the deteriorating building, saving it from closure, and in 1988 it was added to the National Register of Historic Places.

Currently, the hall is used as the offices and performance space of The Footlight Club, and is rented out by the club for private functions.

See also
National Register of Historic Places listings in southern Boston, Massachusetts

References

Buildings and structures in Boston
Theatres on the National Register of Historic Places in Massachusetts
Commercial buildings completed in 1832
Italianate architecture in Massachusetts
Jamaica Plain, Boston
National Register of Historic Places in Boston